Scott Allen Lewis (born December 5, 1965) is an American former baseball pitcher who played in Major League Baseball (MLB) for five seasons.

Career
Lewis attended college at UNLV from 1985 to 1988. He was selected by the California Angels in the 11th round of the 1988 MLB Draft, and pitched for various of their farm teams. He pitched in MLB for the Angels from 1990 to 1994, appearing in 74 games with a 9–9 record with 5.01 ERA. Lewis was released by the Angels in July 1994. He then played for farm teams of the Houston Astros, Seattle Mariners, Boston Red Sox, and San Diego Padres through 1996.

Following his professional baseball career, Lewis became a general contractor.

References

External links
, or Pura Pelota (Venezuelan Winter League)

1965 births
Living people
American expatriate baseball players in Canada
American expatriate baseball players in Mexico
Baseball players from Oregon
Bend Bucks players
California Angels players
Edmonton Trappers players
Lake Elsinore Storm players
Las Vegas Stars (baseball) players
Major League Baseball pitchers
Mexican League baseball pitchers
Midland Angels players
Palm Springs Angels players
Pawtucket Red Sox players
Quad Cities Angels players
Sportspeople from Grants Pass, Oregon
Sultanes de Monterrey players
Tacoma Rainiers players
Tiburones de La Guaira players
American expatriate baseball players in Venezuela
Tigres del México players
Tucson Toros players
UNLV Rebels baseball players
Vancouver Canadians players